The 1898 European Figure Skating Championships were held on February 26 in Trondheim, Norway. Elite figure skaters competed for the title of European Champion in the category of men's singles. The competitors performed only compulsory figures.

Results

Men

Judges:
 H. Bratt 
 A. Gellein 
 Kindt 
 J. Kunig 
 H. N. Stabel

References

Sources
 Result List provided by the ISU

European Figure Skating Championships, 1898
European Figure Skating Championships
1898 in Norwegian sport
International figure skating competitions hosted by Norway
February 1898 sports events
Sports competitions in Trondheim
19th century in Trondheim